Wilhelm Schmidt SVD (February 16, 1868 — February 10, 1954) was a German-Austrian Catholic priest, linguist and ethnologist. He presided over the Fourth International Congress of Anthropological and Ethnological Sciences that was held at Vienna in 1952.

Biography
Wilhelm Schmidt was born in Hörde, Germany in 1868.  He entered the Society of the Divine Word in 1890 and was ordained as a Roman Catholic priest in 1892.  He studied linguistics at the universities of Berlin and Vienna.

Schmidt’s main passion was linguistics. He spent many years in study of languages around the world. His early work was on the Mon–Khmer languages of Southeast Asia, and languages of Oceania and Australia. The conclusions from this study led him to hypothesize the existence of a broader Austric group of languages, which included the Austronesian language group. Schmidt managed to prove that Mon–Khmer language has inner connections with other languages of the South Seas, one of the most significant findings in the field of linguistics.

From 1912 to his death in 1954, Schmidt published his 12-volume Der Ursprung der Gottesidee (The Origin of the Idea of God). There he explained his theory of primitive monotheism, the belief that primitive religion among almost all tribal peoples began with an essentially monotheistic concept of a high god — usually a sky god — who was a benevolent creator.  Schmidt theorized that human beings believed in a God who was the First Cause of all things and Ruler of Heaven and Earth before men and women began to worship a number of gods:
"Schmidt suggested that there had been a primitive monotheism before men and women had started to worship a number of gods. Originally they had acknowledge only one Supreme Deity, who had created the world and governed human affairs from afar."

In 1906, Schmidt founded the journal Anthropos, and in 1931, the Anthropos Institute, both of which still exist today.  In 1938, Schmidt and the Institute fled from Nazi-occupied Austria to Fribourg, Switzerland. He died there in 1954.

His works available in English translation are: The Origin and Growth of Religion: Facts and Theories (1931), High Gods in North America (1933), The Culture Historical Method of Ethnology (1939), and Primitive Revelation (1939).

On Primitive Revelation, Eric J. Sharpe has said: "Schmidt did believe the emergent data of historical ethnology to be fundamentally in accord with biblical revelation—a point which he made in Die Uroffenbarung als Anfang der Offenbarung Gottes (1913) . . . A revised and augmented version of this apologetical monograph was published in an English translation as Primitive Revelation (Sharpe 1939)."

See also 
Robert Holcot

Notes

References 

 An Vandenberghe, "Entre mission et science. La recherche ethnologique du père Wilhelm Schmidt SVD et le Vatican (1900-1939)", Sciences sociales et missions, N°19/December 2006, pp. 15–36
 Schmidt, Wilhelm. 1906. "Die Mon–Khmer-Völker, ein Bindeglied  zwischen Völkern Zentralasiens und Austronesiens", 'The Mon–Khmer peoples, a link between the peoples of Central Asia and Austronesia'. Archiv für Anthropologie, Braunschweig, new series, 5:59-109.
 Schmidt, Wilhelm. 1930. "Die Beziehungen der austrischen Sprachen zum Japanischen", 'The Connections of the Austric Languages to Japanese'. Wien Beitrag zur Kulturgeschichte und Linguistik 1:239-51.
 Peter Rohrbacher, Völkerkunde und Afrikanistik für den Papst. Missionsexperten und der Vatikan 1922–1939 In: Römische Historische Mitteilungen 54 (2012), 583–610.
 Peter Rohrbacher, Pater Wilhelm Schmidt im Schweizer Exil: Interaktionen mit Wehrmachtsdeserteuren und Nachrichtendiensten, 1943–1945 In: Paideuma. Mitteilungen zur Kulturkunde 62, 203–221.
 Peter Rohrbacher, Pater Wilhelm Schmidt und Sigmund Freud: Gesellschaftliche Kontexte einer religionsethnologischen Kontroverse in der Zwischenkriegszeit In: cultura & psyché – Journal of Cultural Psychology Vol. 1, 2020.
 Peter Rohrbacher: Österreichische Missionsexperten und das Ringen um den vatikanischen Standpunkt im „Rassendiskurs“ der Zwischenkriegszeit In: Römische Historische Mitteilungen 62 (2020), 221–248.
 Peter Rohrbacher: Pater Wilhelm Schmidt im Schweizer Exil: Interaktionen mit Wehrmachtsdeserteuren und Nachrichtendiensten, 1943–1945 In: Andre Gingrich; Peter Rohrbacher (Hg.), Völkerkunde zur NS-Zeit aus Wien (1938–1945): Institutionen, Biographien und Praktiken in Netzwerken. Wien: OEAW 2021/3, S. 1611–1642.

External links

1868 births
1954 deaths
German anthropologists
20th-century anthropologists
Linguists from Germany
Paleolinguists
Linguists of Tasmanian languages
Linguists of Austric languages
Linguists of Austronesian languages
Linguists of Austroasiatic languages
Divine Word Missionaries Order
20th-century Austrian Roman Catholic theologians
20th-century German Roman Catholic priests
People from Fribourg